The discography of English-born Australian singer-songwriter Lisa Mitchell. Mitchell finished sixth in the 2006 season of Australian Idol and subsequently signed a record deal with Warner Music Group and has released 3 top ten studio albums and 4 extended plays.

Studio albums

Extended plays

Singles

References 

Discographies of Australian artists
Pop music discographies
Discography